The Likwit Crew is a West Coast hip hop collective. It was founded by King T who recruited Tha Alkaholiks as his first acts. Then, other artists such as Xzibit, Phil Da Agony,Montage Øne, Lootpack, Defari, Styliztik Jones, Declaime, J. Wells and The Barbershop MC's joined.

Extended members and close affiliates include Dilated Peoples and Strong Arm Steady. A spin-off group named Likwit Junkies has been formed by DJ Babu and Defari.

See also
 List of Los Angeles rappers

External links

Hip hop collectives
Hip hop groups from California
Musical groups from Los Angeles